The murder of Janie Perrin occurred on 2 November 1990, when Perrin, a 73-year-old grandmother was sexually assaulted and murdered in her home in Bourke, a town in the Far West of the Australian state of New South Wales.

The crime remains unsolved and the New South Wales Government offers a reward of $100,000 for information leading to the arrest and conviction of those responsible.

Crime
Police believe that shortly after 9pm on 2 November 1990, after Perrin was last seen walking into her flat in Tarcoon Street, she was attacked by an unknown number of males who sexually assaulted her. Police believe Perrin was bludgeoned by her attackers and that a number of personal items belonging to Perrin were stolen.

Investigation
Concerned neighbours contacted Police the following day who discovered Perrin lying deceased in her unit.
Strike Force Pollwood was subsequently formed. It has interviewed hundreds of people during the investigation and remains active.
In November 2006 NSW Police doubled the reward to $100,000.

See also
List of unsolved murders

References

1990 murders in Australia
Bourke, New South Wales
Deaths by person in Australia
Female murder victims
Murder in New South Wales
Unsolved murders in Australia